Pittsburg County is a county located in the U.S. state of Oklahoma. As of the 2010 census, the population was 45,837. Its county seat is McAlester. The county was formed from part of the Choctaw Nation in Indian Territory in 1907. County leaders believed that its coal production compared favorably with Pittsburgh, Pennsylvania at the time of statehood.

Pittsburg County comprises the McAlester, OK Micropolitan Statistical Area.

History
The area forming Pittsburg County was part of the Choctaw Nation after the Choctaw tribe was forced to relocate to Indian Territory from its home in the Southeastern United States in the early 1830s. Unlike the State of Oklahoma, whose county boundaries follow the precise north–south, east–west grid provided by Oklahoma's township and range system, the Choctaw Nation established its internal divisions using easily recognizable landmarks, such as mountains and rivers, as borders.  The territory of present-day Pittsburg County fell within two of the three administrative super-regions comprising the Choctaw Nation, the Moshulatubbee District and Pushmataha District, and within those districts, into Atoka County, Jack's Fork County, Gaines County, Sans Bois County, and Tobucksy County.

Some important trails, including the Texas Road and one route of the California Trail passed through what is now Pittsburg County. In 1840, James Perry established a village called Perryville that became an important stop near the place where the two trails crossed. During the Civil War, Perryville served as an important supply depot for Confederate forces until the Union Army captured and burned the town. It became defunct after the Missouri, Kansas and Texas Railway (MK&T) bypassed it in 1872, and the remaining inhabitants moved to McAlester. The Butterfield Overland Mail route followed a route through this area.

James J. McAlester moved to the Choctaw Nation in 1872, opened a trading post and married a Chickasaw woman. This qualified him to obtain citizenship rights in the Choctaw and Chickasaw Nations. When the MK&T built its line, McAlester laid claim to the coal deposits in the Perryville area, which he and some partners leased to the Osage Coal and Mining Company, which was owned by the Missouri Pacific Railroad and acquired by the MK&T in 1888.

Pittsburg County was formed on July 16, 1907, as an original county from Choctaw land. County leaders, thinking its coal production compared favorably with Pittsburgh, Pennsylvania, named the new county after the Pennsylvania city with the "h" removed. Coal mining continued to expand until the early 20th century. Production began to decline after 1920, and never fully recovered. By 1966, the county production was no longer reported.

Geography
The county's topography is generally hilly to mountainous. The Ouachita Mountains extend into the southeastern portion. The Canadian River drains most of the county and with Eufaula Lake form the northern boundary of the county. The southern part of the county is drained by several creeks that flow into the Kiamichi River and then into the Red River.

Adjacent counties
 McIntosh County (north)
 Haskell County (northeast)
 Latimer County (east)
 Pushmataha County (southeast)
 Atoka County (south)
 Coal County (southwest)
 Hughes County (west)

Demographics

As of the census of 2010, there were 45,837 people, 18,623 households, and 15,389 families residing in the county.  The population density was 13/km2 (34/mi2).  There were 22,634 housing units at an average density of 6/km2 (16/mi2).  The racial makeup of the county was 73.6% White/Caucasian, 3.3% Black or African American, 13.8% Native American, 0.40% Asian, 0.03% Pacific Islander, 0.78% from other races, and 7.6% from two or more races.  3.14% of the population were Hispanic or Latino of any race. 17.4% were of American, 12.7% Irish, 11.3% German, 9.4% English and 7.2% Italian ancestry.

There were 18,623 households, out of which 29.00% had children under the age of 18 living with them, 54.90% were married couples living together, 11.20% had a female householder with no husband present, and 30.40% were non-families. 27.70% of all households were made up of individuals, and 13.30% had someone living alone who was 65 years of age or older.  The average household size was 2.40 and the average family size was 2.90.

In the county, the population was spread out, with 23.50% under the age of 18, 7.80% from 18 to 24, 26.90% from 25 to 44, 24.60% from 45 to 64, and 17.10% who were 65 years of age or older.  The median age was 39 years. For every 100 females there were 101.50 males.  For every 100 females age 18 and over, there were 100.10 males.

The median income for a household in the county was $28,679, and the median income for a family was $35,190. Males had a median income of $28,470 versus $19,886 for females. The per capita income for the county was $15,494.  About 13.60% of families and 17.20% of the population were below the poverty line, including 22.70% of those under age 18 and 13.30% of those age 65 or over.

Politics

Economy
Although Pittsburg county was originally noted for its coal production, agriculture has long been important to the county economy. Just after statehood, farmers controlled 20 percent of the county's land area. The most important cash crops were corn and cotton. By 1960, sorghum had become the most important crop. In 2000, wheat had become the top crop.

Manufacturing became significant when the U.S. Navy built an ammunition depot at McAlester during World War II. It employed 8,000 people in 1945. The U. S. Army took over the facility in 1977.

The Corps of Engineers built Eufaula Lake between 1956 and 1964, which brought tourism, land development and a major source of hydroelectric power.

Communities

Cities
 Haileyville
 Hartshorne
 Krebs
 McAlester (county seat)

Towns

 Alderson
 Ashland
 Canadian
 Carlton Landing
 Crowder
 Indianola
 Kiowa
 Pittsburg
 Quinton
 Savanna

Census-designated places

 Adamson
 Arpelar
 Bache
 Blanco
 Bug Tussle
 Canadian Shores
 Haywood
 Longtown
 Scipio

Other unincorporated places
 Blocker
 Cabaniss – located near the intersection of "Cabiness" Road, US Highway 270 and Twisted Creek Road.
 Ti

Education
School districts include:

K-12:
 Canadian Public Schools
 Clayton Public Schools
 Crowder Public Schools
 Haileyville Public Schools
 Hartshorne Public Schools
 Indianola Public Schools
 Kiowa Public Schools
 McAlester Public Schools
 Pittsburg Public Schools
 Quinton Public Schools
 Savanna Public Schools
 Stuart Public Schools

Elementary only:
 Frink-Chambers Public School
 Haywood Public School
 Krebs Public School
 Tannehill Public School

There is a Bureau of Indian Education (BIE)-affiliated school and boarding facility, Jones Academy (education for grades 1-6, boarding only for grades 7-12)

NRHP sites

The following sites in Pittsburg County are listed on the National Register of Historic Places:

 Aldridge Hotel, McAlester
 Blackburn's Station Site, Pittsburg
 Busby Office Building, McAlester
 Busby Theatre, McAlester
 Canadian Jail and Livery Stable, Canadian
 Choate Cabin, Indianola
 Cole Chapel School, Hartshorne
 Federal Building and US Courthouse, McAlester
 First Presbyterian Church, McAlester
 Hokey's Drugstore, Krebs
 Jeff Lee Park Bath House and Pool, McAlester
 Mass Grave of the Mexican Miners, McAlester
 McAlester Armory, McAlester
 McAlester DX, McAlester
 McAlester House, McAlester
 McAlester Scottish Rite Temple, McAlester
 Mine Rescue Station Building, McAlester
 New State School, McAlester
 OKLA Theater, McAlester
 Perryville, McAlester
 Pittsburg County Courthouse, McAlester
 Pittsburg School and Gymnasium, Pittsburg
 Southern Ice and Cold Storage Company, Pittsburg
 St. Joseph's Catholic Church, Krebs
 Tipton Ridge School, Blocker

References

 
1907 establishments in Oklahoma
Populated places established in 1907